Three-toed woodpecker has been split into the following 2 species:

American three-toed woodpecker
Eurasian three-toed woodpecker

Animal common name disambiguation pages